Club Deportivo Leganés B is a Spanish football team from Leganés, in the Madrid outskirts. They are the reserve team of CD Leganés. They play in white shirts with blue stripes, and white shorts. Their home stadium is the Instalación Deportiva Butarque.

Season to season 
As AD Legamar

As CD Leganés' reserve team

2 seasons in Segunda División B
2 seasons in Segunda Federación
16 seasons in Tercera División

Current squad
.

From Youth Academy

Out on loan

Club officials

Current technical staff

References

External links
Official website 

Football clubs in the Community of Madrid
Association football clubs established in 1959
1959 establishments in Spain
Spanish reserve football teams
CD Leganés